MH Nakhon Si City Football Club (Thai สโมสรฟุตบอล เอ็มเอช นครศรี ซิตี้), is a Thai football club based in Tha Sala, Nakhon Si Thammarat, Thailand. The club is currently playing in the Thai League 3 Southern region.

History
In early 2022, the club was established and competed in Thailand Amateur League Southern region, using the Stadium of Walailak University as ground. At the end of the season, the Wiang Sa City football club competing in the same division as the MH Nakhon Si City football club could promote to a higher division (T3) for next season. Still, they are not ready to compete in a higher division. So, The Wiang Sa City football club sold the right to the MH Nakhon Si City football club. They using the Stadium of Walailak University as a ground to compete for the T3 in the 2022–23 season.

In late 2022, MH Nakhon Si City competed in the Thai League 3 for the 2022–23 season. It is their first season in the professional league. The club started the season with a 4–1 home win over Phatthalung. and they ended the season with a 2–1 away win over the Phatthalung. The club has finished second place in the league of the Southern region and advanced to the national championship state. In addition, in the 2022–23 Thai FA Cup MH Nakhon Si City defeated 0–2 to Roi Et 2018 in the qualifying round, causing them to be eliminated. and in the 2022–23 Thai League Cup MH Nakhon Si City defeated 0–2 to Buriram United in the first round, causing them to be eliminated too.

Stadium and locations

Season by season record

P = Played
W = Games won
D = Games drawn
L = Games lost
F = Goals for
A = Goals against
Pts = Points
Pos = Final position

QR1 = First Qualifying Round
QR2 = Second Qualifying Round
R1 = Round 1
R2 = Round 2
R3 = Round 3
R4 = Round 4

R5 = Round 5
R6 = Round 6
QF = Quarter-finals
SF = Semi-finals
RU = Runners-up
W = Winners

Players

Current squad

References

External links
 Thai League official website
 Club's info from Thai League official website

Association football clubs established in 2022
Football clubs in Thailand
Nakhon Si Thammarat province
2022 establishments in Thailand